Jessica Vosk (born September 30, 1983) is an American singer and actress, known for her work in musical theater.

Vosk is best known for her performance as the lead role of Elphaba in Wicked, which she played on Broadway at the Gershwin Theatre from July 2018 to May 2019 (a period that included the show's 15th Anniversary). She also starred as Elphaba in the show's second national tour from September 2016 to September 2017.

Early life and education
Vosk was raised in Clinton, New Jersey, starting in community theater at a young age.  Her father played in a band and first taught her how to sing. After graduating from North Hunterdon High School, she pursued a degree in musical theater at The Hartt School in West Hartford, Connecticut but transferred to Montclair State University, graduating with a degree in Communications and Public and Investor Relations. She worked in investor relations for three years on Wall Street before deciding to pursue her Broadway ambitions.

Career

Theatre
Vosk's big break came in 2009 when she was cast as a vocalist for the live concert Kristina written by Benny Andersson and Björn Ulvaeus of ABBA and performed at Carnegie Hall and at London's Royal Albert Hall.

Vosk made her Broadway debut in 2014 in Jason Robert Brown's Bridges of Madison County. She was cast as a swing, and she made her principal debut as Marian. She also was an understudy for the role of Chiara.

 
From The Bridges of Madison County she went to Finding Neverland, in which she was in the original Broadway production playing the role of Miss Bassett and an understudy for Mrs du Maurier.

She then played Fruma Sarah in the 2015–2016 Broadway Revival of Fiddler on the Roof. She also was an understudy for Golde/Yente.

Also in 2014, she performed as Anita in the San Francisco Symphony's live recording of the West Side Story score which was nominated for a Grammy.

Vosk left Fiddler on The Roof in 2016 to join the cast of the Second National Tour of Wicked succeeding Emily Koch in the lead role of Elphaba. She made her debut in South Bend, Indiana on September 7, 2016 opposite Amanda Jane Cooper as Glinda. Her last show on the tour was September 24, 2017 in Cincinnati, Ohio.

On June 18, 2018, it was announced that Vosk would reprise the role of Elphaba in the Broadway production of Wicked, succeeding Jackie Burns. Her first performance took place on July 16, 2018 at the Gershwin Theatre. Vosk ended her run as Elphaba on May 12, 2019 and was succeeded by Hannah Corneau.  Vosk was the winner of the 2019 Broadway.com Audience Choice Award for Best Replacement (Female) for her portrayal of Elphaba.

Also in 2019 Vosk originated the role of Aunt Val in the world premiere of the musical adaptation of Becoming Nancy. The production played at the Coca-Cola Stage at the Alliance Theatre, which is part of the Atlanta Theatre Company from September 6 to October 6, 2019.  Vosk was the winner of the BroadwayWorld Atlanta Best Actress in a Musical Award.

On February 17, 2020, Vosk appeared as one of The Narrators in the 50th Anniversary concert of Joseph and the Amazing Technicolor Dreamcoat at Lincoln Center.

Vosk made her solo Carnegie Hall debut on November 8, 2021.

Recording work 

Vosk released her first album titled Wild and Free on August 10, 2018.  The album is a mix of musical theatre and pop and includes songs by Sara Bareilles, Jason Robert Brown, Prince, Sia, Pasek and Paul, and more. The album debuted on the Billboard Charts at No. 29 for Independent Artists and No. 12 for Heatseekers (up and coming musicians).

Vosk released an EP of Christmas songs titled A Very CoCo Christmas on December 9, 2020.

Other work 
She is the co-host of the podcast "Killing it on Broadway" with Jennifer Simard.

Personal life
Vosk has been a resident of West New York, New Jersey, and has a dog named Fred.

Theatre credits

Solo concerts and cabarets
 2015: I Came From Jersey For This! (Feinstein's/54 Below)
 2016: You Asked For It (Joe's Pub)
 2018: Being Green (Feinstein's / 54 Below)
 2019-Present: Wild and Free: In Concert (Various)
 2021: My Golden Age (Carnegie Hall)
 2022: Get Happy: A Judy Garland Centennial Celebration

Discography

LPs
 2018: Wild and Free (Broadway Records)

EPs 
 2020: A Very CoCo Christmas (Vosky Records)

Awards and nominations

References

American musical theatre actresses
American women singers
Living people
1983 births
Actresses from New Jersey
Montclair State University alumni
North Hunterdon High School alumni
People from Clinton, New Jersey
People from West New York, New Jersey
University of Hartford Hartt School alumni
21st-century American women